Rafael Andrés Sánchez Islas (born 1 February 1998) is a Venezuelan footballer who plays as a goalkeeper for Venezuelan Primera División side Aragua FC.

Career

Aragua FC
Aragua FC announced the signing of Sánchez on 13 December 2018.

International career
Sánchez was called up to the Venezuela under-20 side for the 2017 FIFA U-20 World Cup.

Career statistics

Club

Honours 

Venezuela U-20
FIFA U-20 World Cup: Runner-up 2017
South American Youth Football Championship: Third Place 2017

References

External links
 Rafael Sánchez at Footballdatabase

1998 births
Living people
Venezuelan footballers
Deportivo Táchira F.C. players
Aragua FC players
Venezuelan Primera División players
Association football goalkeepers